Harar (Harari: ሀረር; ;) known historically by the indigenous as Harar-Gey or simply Gey (Harari: ጌይ Gēy) is a walled city in eastern Ethiopia. It is also known in Arabic as the City of Saints.

Harar is the capital city of the Harari Region.

For centuries, Harar has been a major commercial center, linked by the trade routes with the rest of Ethiopia, the entire Horn of Africa, the Arabian Peninsula, Asia, and through its ports, the outside world. Harar Jugol, the old walled city, was listed as a World Heritage Site in 2006 by UNESCO in recognition of its cultural heritage. Because of Harar's long history of involvement during times of trade in the Arabian Peninsula, the Government of Ethiopia has made it a criminal offence to demolish or interfere with any historical sites or fixtures in the city. These include stone homes, museums and items discarded from war. According to UNESCO, it is "considered 'the fourth holiest city' of Islam" with 82 mosques, three of which date from the 10th century, and 102 shrines.

Yahyá Naṣrallāh's Fatḥ Madīnat Harar, an unpublished history of the city in the 13th century, records that the legendary saint Abadir Umar ar-Rida and several other religious leaders settled in the Harar plateau  (612 AH). Harar was later made the new capital of the Adal Sultanate in 1520 by the Sultan Abu Bakr ibn Muhammad. The city saw a political decline during the ensuing Emirate of Harar, only regaining some significance in the Khedivate of Egypt period. During the Ethiopian Empire, the city decayed while maintaining a certain cultural prestige.

History

When Harar was founded is unclear and various dates have been suggested. In any case, the modern city of Harar mostly dates back to the 1700s at the earliest, but the site itself has been the site of a city for much longer.

It is likely the original inhabitants of the region are the Harari people. Harar was part of the Harla Kingdom's domain in the sixth century. In the Islamic period, the city was under an alliance of confederated states of Zeila. According to the twelfth-century Jewish traveler Benjamin of Tudela, the Zeila region was the land of the Havilah, confined by al-Habash in the west.

In the ninth century, Harar was under the Maḥzūmī dynasty's Sultanate of Shewa.

Islam had gained a foothold on the Harar plateau by the 10th-11th centuries CE via trade with Zeila. By the 13th century Islam had become the predominant religion in the region.

The rise of Muslim states

Harar emerged as the center of Islamic culture and religion in the Horn of Africa during end of the Middle Ages.

According to the Fatḥ Madīnat Harar, the legendary saint Abadir Umar ar-Rida, along with several other religious leaders, came from the Arabian Peninsula to settle in the Harar plateau circa 612H (1216 CE), where Abadir was supposedly met by the Harla, Gaturi and Argobba people. According to tradition, Abadir's brother Fakr ad-Din founded the Sultanate of Mogadishu, while one of his descendants founded the Hadiya Sultanate.

According to the 14th century chronicles of Amda Seyon I, Gēt (Gēy) was a colony in the Harla country. During the Middle Ages, Harar was part of the Adal Sultanate, becoming its capital in 1520 under Sultan Abu Bakr ibn Muhammad. The sixteenth century was the city's Golden Age. The local culture flourished, and many poets lived and wrote there. It also became known for coffee, weaving, basketry and bookbinding.

From Harar, Ahmad ibn Ibrahim al-Ghazi, also known as "Gurey" and "Grañ", both meaning "the Left-handed", launched a war of conquest in the sixteenth century that extended the polity's territory and threatened the existence of the neighboring Oriental Orthodox Christian Ethiopian Empire. His successor, Emir Nur ibn Mujahid, built a protective wall around the city to defend its population from the oromo invasion. Four meters in height with five gates, this structure, called the Jugol, is still intact and is a symbol of the town to the inhabitants Harari people. Siltʼe, Wolane, Halaba and Harari people lived in Harar, while the former three moved to the Gurage region.

Immediately after Ahmad's wars, Harar experienced a severe famine. The prices of food and livestock rose significantly: one sa'a (a unit equal to four handfuls) of sorghum cost 12 ashrafis, and an equal amount of salt cost 15. A cow cost over 300 ashrafis. As the economy recovered from the famine, the price of a sa'a of sorghum fell to 4-5 mahallaks (a sub-denomination of the ashrafi). Another famine during the reign of Nur ibn Mujahid raised the cost of a sa'a of sorghum to 2 ashrafis. This is the first mention of the ashrafi and mahallak as denominations of money in Harar.

The Emirate of Harar also struck its own currency, the earliest possible issues bearing a date that may be read as 615 AH (1218/19 CE); but the first coins were definitely issued by 1789 CE, and more were issued into the nineteenth century.

Elisée Reclus (1886) describes the two main ancient routes leading from Harar to Zeila, one route passing through the country of the Gadabuursi and one route passing through Issa territory, both subclans of the Dir clan family:

"Two routes, often blocked by the inroads of plundering hordes, lead from Harrar to Zeila. One crosses a ridge to the north of the town, thence redescending into the basin of the Awash by the Galdessa Pass and valley, and from this point running towards the sea through Issa territory, which is crossed by a chain of trachytic rocks trending southwards. The other and more direct but more rugged route ascends north-eastwards towards the Darmi Pass, crossing the country of the Gadibursis or Gudabursis. The town of Zeila lies south of a small archipelago of islets and reefs on a point of the coast where it is hemmed in by the Gadibursi tribe. It has two ports, one frequented by boats but impracticable for ships, whilst the other, not far south of the town, although very narrow, is from 26 to 33 feet deep, and affords safe shelter to large craft."

Decline

Following the death of Emir Nur, Harar began a steady decline in wealth and power. A later ruler, Imam Muhammed Jasa, a kinsman of Ahmad Gragn, known as, Ahmad ibn Ibrahim al Ghazi yielded to the pressures of increasing Oromo raids and in 1577 abandoned the city, relocating to Aussa and making his brother ruler of Harar. The new base not only failed to provide more security from the Oromo invasion, it attracted the hostile attention of the neighboring Afar people, who raided caravans traveling between Harar and the coast. The Imamate of Aussa declined over the next century while Harar regained its independence under `Ali ibn Da`ud, the founder of a dynasty that ruled the city from 1647 until 1875, when it was conquered by Egypt.

In the 1800s Emir Ahmad III ibn Abu Bakr halted all imports and exports from the port of Zeila opting for Berbera instead due to a dispute with his mother the Somali sister of the chief Giri clan controlling the route to Zeila. According to Richard Francis Burton, who visited both Berbera and Harar during his travels, he repeated a famous Harari saying he heard in 1854: "He who commands at Berbera, holds the beard of Harar in his hands." In this period slaves of Sidama and Gurage stock were important commodities exported to the coast. A significant portion of the trade between the two historic towns was controlled by merchants belonging to the Isaaq Somali clan, who also partook in the trade of the renowned Harari coffee bean, which were named Berbera Coffee in the international market. Harar was also the home of numerous Somali scholars who came to the city to study the most notable being Sheikh Madar founder of Hargeisa.

Harar appears to have begun minting coins more-or-less continuously during the reign of the emir Abd al-Shakur ibn Yusuf. Surviving coins from his reign are of high quality, with a high silver content and clear inscriptions reflecting the use of good dies. The currency was heavily debased under Muhammad ibn Ali, who introduced a new type of coin, heavily alloyed with tin, in order to meet his obligations to his Gosa brothers. He decreed that anyone with the old currency had to exchange it for the new kind. Muhammad Mukhtar, an officer in the Egyptian army, wrote in 1876 condemning this as a massive fraud. In 1883, a German traveller wrote that the currency was not worth even one-tenth of its nominal value.

19th Century

In 1875 Muhammad Rauf Pasha led an Egyptian force from Zeila into the interior of southeast Ethiopia, pretending to be a scientific expedition.
It occupied Harar on 11 October 1875.

Rauf Pasha initially suspended Harari coins from circulation and sent some samples to Cairo for analysis, hoping to replace them with Egyptian currency. However, the Egyptian government was unable to provide enough money to do this and advised him to keep Harari currency in use. However, the value of the Harari mahallak was reassessed from 33 to the Maria Theresa thaler before to 300 to the dollar after. Once the analysis of the coins' silver content was completed, this was further changed to 311 to the thaler.

During the period of Egyptian rule (1875-1884), Arthur Rimbaud lived in the city as the local functionary of several different commercial companies based in Aden; he returned in 1888 to resume trading in coffee, musk, and skins until a fatal disease forced him to return to France. A house said to have been his residence is now a museum.

In 1885, Harar regained its independence under Amir Abdullahi, but this lasted only two years until 9 January 1887 when the Battle of Chelenqo led to Harar's conquest by Emperor Menelik II of Ethiopia's growing empire based in Shewa.

Harar was the place where the modern Ethiopian state minted its first coins under Menelik II, bearing the date of 1885 E.C. (1892 CE).

Harar lost some of its commercial importance with the creation of the French-built Addis Ababa–Djibouti Railway, initially intended to run via the city but diverted north of the mountains between Harar and the Awash River to save money. As a result of this, Dire Dawa was founded in 1902 as New Harar. The British planned to revitalise the historic Harar-Berbera trade route by connecting the two cities via rail as a means to bolster trade. However, the initiative was vetoed by parliament on the grounds that it would harm the Entente Cordiale between France and Britain.

All the trade routes linking Harar to the Somali coast passed through the Somali and Oromo territories where the Gadabuursi and Issa subclans of the Dir clan family held the monopoly of trade as is mentioned in the History of Harar and the Hararis:

"In the 19th century the jurisdiction of the Amirs was limited to Harar and its close environs, while the whole trade routes to the coast passed through Oromo and the Somali territories. There were only two practicable routes: one was the Jaldeissa, through Somali Issa and Nole Oromo territories, the other of Darmy through the Gadaboursi. The Somali, who held a monopoly as transporters, took full advantage of the prevailing conditions and the merchants were the victim of all forms of abuse and extortion... Under the supervision of these agents the caravan would be entrusted to abbans (caravan protector), who usually belonged to the Issa or Gadaboursi when destined to the coast and to Jarso when destined for the interior."

20th Century until present

Harar was captured by Italian troops under Marshall Rodolfo Graziani during the Second Italo-Ethiopian War on 8 May 1936. The 1st battalion of the Nigeria Regiment, advancing from Jijiga by way of the Marda Pass, captured the city for the allies 29 March 1941. Following the conclusion of the Anglo-Ethiopian Agreement in 1944, the government of the United Kingdom were granted permission to establish a consulate in Harar, although the British refused to reciprocate by allowing an Ethiopian one at Hargeisa. After numerous reports of British activities in the Haud that violated the London Agreement of 1954, the Ethiopian Ministry of Foreign Affairs ordered the consulate closed March 1960.

In 1995, the city and its environs became an Ethiopian region (or kilil) in its own right. A pipeline to carry water to the city from Dire Dawa is currently under construction.

Culture
According to Sir Richard Burton Harar is the birthplace of the khat plant. The original domesticated coffee plant is also said to have been from Harar.

Climate
The climate of Harar is classified as subtropical highland climate (Cwb) in Köppen-Geiger climate classification system.

Throughout the year, afternoon temperatures are warm to very warm, whilst mornings are cool to mild. Rain falls between March and October with a peak in August, whilst November to February is usually dry.

Demographics

Based on the 2007 national census conducted by the Central Statistical Agency of Ethiopia (CSA), Harar city had a total urban population of 99,368, of whom 49,727 were men and 49,641 were women. The six largest ethnic groups reported in Harar were the Amhara (40.55%), the Oromo (28.14%), the Harari (11.83%), the Gurage (7.94%), the Somali (6.82%), and the Tigrayans (2.76%); all other ethnic groups comprised less than 2% of the population. Amharic was spoken as a first language by 49.2% of city inhabitants, Oromo by 23.7%, Harari by 12.2%, and Somali by 6.6%. The plurality of urban inhabitants professed Ethiopian Orthodox Christianity, with 48.54% of the population having reported they practiced that belief, while 44.56% of the population said they were Muslim, and 6.14% were Protestant.

Ethnicity

Barker Haines reported in 1840 that the majority of the population of Harar were Hararis however a few Oromo, Afar, Somali Issa and Arabian traders of Yemen were also present. In 1855 Richard Francis Burton described Harar as having an approximately 8,000 inhabitants; 3,000 Bedouins (referring to seasonal nomads who "come and go", 2,500 Hararis, and 2,500 Somalis. Burton further reported a large Oromo presence leading to the town. During his visit in the Khedivate of Egypt occupation of the Emirate of Harar, researcher Paultischke describes Harar as having roughly 40,000 inhabitants with 25,000 of these being Hararis, 6,000 Oromo, 5,000 Somalis, 3,000 Abyssinians as well as a minority of Europeans and Asians.

After the conquest of the Emirate of Harar by Ethiopian Empire, an influx of Amhara settled in Harar and its surroundings. The Somali population of the town was decimated following the overthrow of Lij Iyasu by Abyssinian militias. The indigenous Harari natives who once were majority within the walled city are under 15%, due to ethnic cleansing by the Haile Selassie regime. As a result of the repression by the Ethiopian regime, in the late 1970s Hararis residing in Addis Ababa outnumbered those in Harar. According to Feener, the Harari have not recovered from the 1948 state led crackdown on their population.

The Somali tribes surrounding Harar are mainly from the Gadabuursi and Issa subclans of the Dir and the Karanle subclan of the Hawiye. They represent the most native Somali clans in the region. The Darod clans of the Geri and Jidwaaq also inhabit areas near Harar. The Gadabuursi and Geri Somali strike immediately north and north eastwards of the town. Richard Francis Burton (1856) describes the Gadabuursi and Geri Somali clans as extending to within sight of Harar. The Issa and Karanle Hawiye strike north and north westwards whilst the Jidwaaq strike eastwards.

I.M. Lewis (1998) states:
"Including the land round Harar and Dire Dawa inhabited by the Somalis of the 'Iise and Gadabuursi clans."

City layout

The old walled city of Harar is divided into 5 quarters: Assum Bari, Argob Bari, Suqutat Bari, Bedro Bari, and Asmadin Bari. These quarters are then further divided into neighborhoods called toya, which are often named after a Muslim shrine or a prominent tree serving as a local landmark. According to S.R. Waldron, there were 59 such neighborhoods around 1975.

In the late 1960s, it was still possible to walk around the outside of the city walls on foot; doing so took about an hour. By the early 1980s, though, this was no longer possible because the city had begun to expand out from the walled city, with some buildings being built directly attached to the outside of the wall.

Houses

Known as gey gar ("city house", plural: gey garach), Harari houses form a distinct archetype that differs from other Muslim regions and from other parts of Ethiopia. The traditional Harari house design is still widely in use today, with only minor changes, and Hararis who have moved to other cities try to adhere to a similar style. Hararis take great pride in their houses, and they form an important part of Harari culture.

A walled compound (abāt) consists of several residences, which share the same walls but are not interconnected. They are arranged around a courtyard, with most of the windows facing the courtyard instead of the street. Doors to individual residences almost always point east or west; north- or south-facing doors are rare. According to Kabir Abdulmuheimen Abdulnassir, farmers and merchants often have east-facing doors so that they can rise early for work. The several families who live in the same compound share one or two kitchens, which are disconnected from the residences. The walls that surround the compounds are joined so that they are basically continuous. The outer gate facing the street is usually wooden but sometimes iron, and they are either painted or whitewashed. The walls form an architrave around them.

Sometimes several compounds are joined into a "block" of compounds, all surrounded by the same wall and then having their own walls around them. These "blocks" are set up so that a visitor passes the first compound before reaching the second, etc.

Building materials are local stone, while a mixture of pounded stones and clay are used as both mortar and plaster to cover the walls before they are whitewashed. This is the case in newer houses as well as older ones.

The floor plan of a typical Harari house is rectangular. The main room is the large living room called the gidīr gār or the gār ēqäd. The gidīr gār has several raised platforms, called nädäbas, which function as seats or beds. A typical house will have five nädäbas. At the back of the gidir gar, across from the front door, are two nädäbas: the "small" one, or tīt nädäba, and then behind it the "big" one, or gidīr nädäba, which is somewhat higher up. These are the two largest nädäbas. Shoes may be worn as far as the tīt nädäba, but then they must be removed. The tīt nädäba is where younger people or people with less seniority sit. Children also sleep on this nädäba. Historically, at the emir's court, it served as the seat for plaintiffs or defendants. The gidīr nädäba seats elders and people who are considered more senior. Historically, at the emir's court, dignitaries were seated here. When a person dies, their body is kept on the gidīr nädäba before being buried as a sign of respect. A basin is dug in the gidīr nädäba and filled with water and used to wash the body, and then the basin is filled in again.

The amīr nädäba, or nädäba of honor, is reserved for the master of the house and for honored guests; it can be on either the left or the right depending on the house. It is positioned so that the head of the family can see whoever enters the home and act accordingly. The "hidden" nädäba, or the sutri nädäba, can also be on either side but is always behind a protruding pillar or maxazu. Historically, this is known as the "malassay nädäba" because the guards of the emir would sit here during meetings or court cases. The sutri nädäba is used for sleeping. It is also used as a seat where the husband rests when he comes home. Finally, there is the gäbti äḥer näbäda, or the one behind the entrance door. Like the amīr and sutri nädäbas, this one can be on either the left or the right. At the back corners there are sometimes built-in cupboards or wardrobes called näbäda dēras. Cash and important documents are kept in a chest in the näbäda dēra. The upper part of the näbäda dēra is used to store clothes belonging to the master of the house.

The gidīr gār has built-in niches called ṭāqēts which are used to store and display personal possessions. They are fairly high up and there are typically 11 of them: 5 on the main wall opposite the door, and the rest on the other walls. The two rectangular niches in the middle of the main wall (called ēqäd ṭāqēt) are typically used to store books, especially the Qur'an. Their rectangular shape is supposed to be evocative of death and the grave. In addition to the 11 main niches, there are sometimes also niches in the nädäbas, which are used to hold shoes or an incense burner.

On either side of the entrance there is an open doorway leading to the kirtät, which is a side room with a low ceiling and its own nädäba. The wall between the kirtät and the gidīr gār sometimes has a window screen with decorative woodcarving. Women usually stay in the kirtät when men have a bärça (a meeting to chew khat and meditate). In the past, the kirtät was also where a young bride would live in seclusion for 8 months after her wedding. In that case the entryway to the kirtät, which does not otherwise have a door, would be covered with a bamboo screen and a curtain.

A second side room with a low ceiling, the dēra, is connected to the kirtät by a small door. It is used to store items which are not susceptible to attack by rats. Next to the door, the wall of the dēra has a special niche where the aflālas are kept. These are black pottery containers with long necks and covered by elongated basketry lids called aflāla uffas. They are used to store the family's jewelry and other valuables, as well as the umbilical cords of the family's children. According to Fethia Ahmed, curator of the Harari cultural museum, the lids being turned upside down indicates that the husband has died and that there is a widow living in the house.

The dēra is a private space, where a husband and wife may speak without their children listening. It is also used by children between the ages of 3 and 7 to eat during Ramadan out of public view, before they begin to fast all day long at age 7. The dēra is built with porous stone without cement to allow for better ventilation.

The ceiling above the gidīr gār rises to the full height of the house. Above the side rooms, though, there is an upper level called the qala. Originally, the qala was used mainly for storage and sometimes as a sleeping area, and it was not separated from the gidīr gār in any way. Since the late 19th century, though, there is usually a wooden screen separating the two, and the qala has basically become a distinct second floor, often with several rooms, although without nädäbas or other installations. The staircase to the qala usually consists of 6 to 9 steps. In newer houses it has a carved wood banister but in older houses it did not.

House ceilings are traditionally made of thin tree trunks which have had their bark stripped off. Today the ceiling is whitewashed along with the rest of the house. One beam, located above the edge of the tīt nädäba, is called the ḥāmil; today it is used to hang a neon lamp from, but in the past people would hang an ostrich egg from it because it was believed that doing so would protect the house from lightning. Nowadays, the ceilings are made of varnished wooden planks, with the ḥāmil distinguished by its larger size and distinct shape.

Floors are traditionally made of red earth (called qēḥ afär), and the parts of nädäbas that aren't covered by rugs or mats are also painted red. Today they are often tiled, usually with at least some red present. The red is supposed to be reminiscent of the blood shed at the Battle of Chelenqo.

Some houses will have an adjoining tīt gār or "small house", which has a separate entrance and a nädäba of its own. The tīt gār is often unconnected to the main house. It is used by younger family members, or sometimes rented to tenants. Since the 20th century, some houses add another level above the tīt gār and connect it to the qala as well as giving it a separate entrance via a staircase on the outside of the house.

Each compound typically contained a separate room for a farmhand or servant, without nädäbas or side rooms. There would also be stables for cows and donkeys. There are also typically one or two "kitchen houses", unconnected to the houses, typically located on either sides of the courtyard. These kitchens have no windows, with smoke escaping through the door, so eventually the walls end up covered in soot. Shelves made from tree trunks are used to store kitchen utensils.

In the past, Harari houses would have little to no furniture. Since the 20th century, simple Western-style wooden chairs have proliferated, as well as metal bedsteads with kapok mattresses which are set up on the sutri nädäba.

Richard Francis Burton described the emir's home as the only building whose exterior was whitewashed, implying that most buildings were undecorated at the time of his visit in the 1800s. Most houses were similarly described as neither painted nor whitewashed as late as 1935. Today, though, Hararis typically whitewash their houses with a limestone mixture (called näçih afär) at least once and ideally twice a year, once before Ramadan and once again before the Aräfa festival. Household items and baskets are thoroughly cleaned at the same time. Today, instead of whitewashing, walls are sometimes painted using oil paints. This can be any color, although green is the most popular.

Interior decorating of homes is typically done by women. They cover the nädäbas with rugs, mats, and pillows, and decorate the walls with Harari basketry (which is also typically made by women). Enamel plates and bowls are also hung on the walls today. Decorative baskets are generally hung up symmetrically and in pairs. Each household has its own style of decoration, and women guests often comment on how they like how the host's house is decorated. There is a stereotype that younger women are more fastidious at decorating their homes than older women, and that younger couples reapply the red earth to the floors once a week while older ones only do it a few times a year.

The largest type of decorative baskets are the kind that are used to serve bread and sweets at women's gatherings. These have tall conical lids that are hung above and overlapping them. They are hung in one or two rows on the wall behind the gidīr nädäba and below the niches, and they are typically in alternating pairs. Between the ēqäd ṭāqēts, the two rectangular niches in the center used for storing books, there is a vertical line of small basketry plates called sāgāris along with their lids. These are used to serve coffee beans at wedding or funeral feasts. They are typically in a group of 3, with 2 of them sharing a pattern and design. Next to the amīr nädäba and the dēra, the wall is decorated with other basketry plates in pairs. These are about the size of a breakfast plate and traditionally are used to serve bread. Two of them are called "the baskets for the mother-in-law", or the ḥamāt mot, and these are presented by the family of a bride to the in-laws at a wedding.

Emigrants from Harar often try to stick to the traditional Harari home layout when possible, even in buildings with different architectural styles. There will be some sort of gidīr gār indicated, with rugs and pillows forming an informal nädäba, and the walls will be decorated with traditional Harari basketry.

Attractions

Besides the stone wall surrounding the city, the old town is home to 110 mosques and many more shrines, centered on Feres Magala square. Notable buildings include Medhane Alem Cathedral, the house of Arthur Rimbaud, the sixteenth century Jami Mosque and historic Great Five Gates of Harar. Harrar Bira Stadium is the home stadium for the Harrar Beer Bottling FC. One can also visit the market.

A long-standing tradition of feeding meat to spotted hyenas also evolved during the 1960s into an impressive night show for tourists. (See spotted hyenas in Harar.)

Other places of interest include the highest amba overlooking the city, the Kondudo or "W" mountain, which hosts an ancient population of feral horses. A 2008 scientific mission has unleashed efforts for their conservation, as the animals are greatly endangered.

The Harar Brewery was established in 1984. Its beers can be sampled at the brewery social club adjacent to the brewery in Harar.

Intercity bus service is provided by the Selam Bus Line Share Company.

Authenticity
Harar Jugol is a rare example of a relatively well preserved historic town that has retained its traditions, urban fabric, and rich Harari Muslim cultural heritage to the present time. It is one of the holy towns of Islam in Africa, and the capital of a minority region within Christian Ethiopia. The historic city is physically limited and well defined by its 16th century surrounding wall and the setting has been retained along the eastern and south-eastern sides of the property. However, inappropriate interventions, such as plastering the houses, changing doors from wood to metal, the introduction of non-traditional materials and visual impacts such as TV antennas have been gradually affecting the authenticity of the historic fabric.

Sister cities

Notable residents

'Abd Allah II ibn 'Ali 'Abd ash-Shakur, last emir of Harar
Abadir Umar ar-Rida, legendary Muslim saint and founder of Harar
Amha Selassie, Emperor of the Ethiopian Empire (Designate)
Mahfuz, Imam and General of the Adal Sultanate
Bati del Wambara, wife of Ahmad ibn Ibrahim al-Ghazi
Nur ibn Mujahid, Emir of Harar
Abdullah al-Harari, leader of al-Ahbash
Malik Ambar, Leader of Ahmadnagar Sultanate
`Ali ibn Da`ud, Founder of Emirate of Harar
Ambassador Mohammed Abdurahman, First Harari Lawyer, Grandson of Hajji Abdullahi Sadiq
Hajji Abdullahi Ali Sadiq, businessman and Governor of Ogaden 1889 -1914
Arthur Rimbaud, the French poet, settled as a merchant in Harar between 1880 and 1891
Haile Selassie, Emperor of Ethiopia
Ahmad ibn Ibrahim al-Ghazi, Leader of Adal Sultanate
Sheikh Madar Shirwa, Somali Sheikh who founded the Hargeisa Tariqa (religious commune)

See also
 Harari language
 Harari people
 East Hararghe
 West Hararghe
Dire Dawa
Harar Brewery
Coffee production in Harar
Hargeisa, a city in Somaliland also called "Little Harar"
Islam in Ethiopia
Harar's significance in Islam
Project Harar
Silt'e people, an ethnic claiming to originate from Harar
List of World Heritage Sites in Ethiopia

Notes

References

Further reading
Fritz Stuber, "Harar in Äthiopien – Hoffnungslosigkeit und Chancen der Stadterhaltung" (Harar in Ethiopia – The Hopelessness and Challenge of Urban Preservation), in: Die alte Stadt. Vierteljahreszeitschrift für Stadtgeschichte, Stadtsoziologie, Denkmalpflege und Stadtentwicklung (W. Kohlhammer Stuttgart Berlin Köln), Vol. 28, No. 4, 2001, pp. 324–343, 14 ill.
David Vô Vân, Mohammed Jami Guleid, Harar, a cultural guide, Shama Books, Addis Abeba, 2007, 99 pages

External links

Harar City
Everything Harar
Fascist plan to destroy and rebuild Harar along ideological guidelines (1936)

Harari Region
Holy cities
Cities of the Adal Sultanate
Populated places in the Harari Region
World Heritage Sites in Ethiopia
Ethiopia
Cities and towns in Ethiopia